A growth factor-like domain (GFLD) is a protein domain structurally related to epidermal growth factor, which has a high binding affinity for the epidermal growth factor receptor. As structural domains within larger proteins, GFLD regions commonly bind calcium ions. A subtype present in the N-terminal region of the amyloid precursor protein is a member of the heparin-binding class of GFLDs and may itself have growth factor function, particularly in promoting neuronal development.

References

  

Protein domains